Christiansburg station was an intercity rail station located in Christiansburg, Virginia. Originally built in 1906 to replace a previous station, it was served by Norfolk and Western Railway passenger trains until 1971. It was later served by Amtrak's Mountaineer from 1975 to 1977, then the Hilltopper until 1979. The station building remains extant.

History

The Virginia and Tennessee Railroad was built through Christiansburg in 1857. Originally planned to go through the town center, it was rerouted to the north due to the concerns of town leaders. A train station was built in Cambria (which was a separate municipality until 1964).

Much of the railroad was destroyed by Union forces during the Civil War. In 1868–69, a larger one-story station was built. That station was itself too small after several decades; a new station was built in 1906 and the older station because the town's freight house.

Amtrak service
Even as local service petered out in the 1960s, the Norfolk and Western Railway (N&W) continued to run the crack Norfolk-Cincinnati Pocahontas and the local station counterpart on the same route, the Powhatan Arrow.  The N&W also operated the Birmingham–Washington Birmingham Special (unnamed after February 1970 and cut back to Bristol in August 1970), the New Orleans-Washington Pelican (discontinued, 1970) and the Memphis-bound Tennessean. When Amtrak took over intercity passenger rail service on May 1, 1971, it chose not to continue service on the two trains, thus ending service to Christiansburg.

Service was restored on March 24, 1975 with the introduction of the Mountaineer service between Norfolk and Chicago. The Mountaineer was replaced by the Hilltopper on June 1, 1977. The Hilltopper was discontinued on October 1, 1979, ending rail service to Christiansburg for the second time.

Proposed new service
Amtrak's Northeast Regional service was extended to Roanoke station in late 2017. In January 2016, the New River Valley Metropolitan Planning Organization named three sites in Christiansburg – two off Franklin Street and one in Cambria – as possible sites for a station in the New River Valley should service be extended further to Bristol. Sites in Dublin, Pulaski, and Radford were also considered. In May 2016, the town purchased  of residential land off Franklin Street for potential future station use. Christiansburg was selected as the future station site and is expected to open in 2025 when a new passenger platform is constructed.

Christiansburg is also proposed to be the western terminus of east-west cross-state service to the Hampton Roads area, which would be the first such service since the Hilltopper.

References

External links 

TrainWeb USA Rail Guide – Christiansburg

Transportation in Montgomery County, Virginia
Former Amtrak stations in Virginia
Norfolk and Western Railway stations
Buildings and structures in Montgomery County, Virginia
Railway stations in the United States opened in 1857
Railway stations in the United States opened in 1975
Railway stations closed in 1971
Railway stations closed in 1979
Railway stations scheduled to open in 2025
Future Amtrak stations in the United States